Jon Corey Hart (born March 24, 1982) is an American former professional baseball right fielder. He played in Major League Baseball (MLB) for the Milwaukee Brewers from 2004 through 2013, the Seattle Mariners in 2014 and the Pittsburgh Pirates in 2015. Hart was a two-time MLB All-Star, and also participated in the MLB Home Run Derby.

High school career 
Prior to being drafted in the 11th round of the 2000 MLB Draft, Hart played for the Greenwood High School Gators in Bowling Green, Kentucky. Hart also played basketball for four years for the Gators for Coach Jason Couch. On the diamond, he played nearly every position, routinely in the middle infield and even pitching in relief for Coach Chris Decker. Hart's jersey is retired by Greenwood and hangs from the rafters in the school's gymnasium.

Hart played American Legion Baseball and was named the program's Graduate of the Year for 2011.

Minor league career 
Hart started his career in 2000 with the Rookie League Ogden Raptors, primarily playing at first base. He moved up to the single-A High Desert Mavericks and then the double-A Huntsville Stars by the  season; defensive problems caused Hart to be moved to the outfield. Playing there, he moved up to the Class AAA Indianapolis Indians by 2004.

In 2005, Hart batted .308 with 17 home runs and 69 RBIs in 113 games for the triple-A Nashville Sounds. While there, Hart played alongside future major league teammates Prince Fielder and JJ Hardy. He also had 31 stolen bases, a relatively unusual feat for a player as tall as the  Hart. Hart continued to play in both the minor and major leagues through 2006, and was regarded as one of Milwaukee's top prospects.

Major league career

Milwaukee Brewers
Hart made his MLB debut with the Brewers on May 25, 2004. Hart's next appearance in the majors was Sunday, August 14, 2005, when he hit his first career MLB home run, a three-run blast against the Cincinnati Reds into the Upper Deck at Miller Park. Hart played 87 games for the major league club in 2006 and was with the Brewers for the entire 2007 season, mainly seeing action in right-field. Hart also led off for the Brewers for almost half of the 2007 season when second baseman Rickie Weeks was on the disabled list. May 29, 2010 Hart hit his first major league grand slam. In that game against the Mets he had two home runs.

During the 2007 season, Hart had a 22-game hitting streak which was finally snapped in a July 7 game against the Washington Nationals, as Hart went 0–4 with a walk. In 2007, Hart became the first Brewer since 2003 to steal 20 bases and hit 20 home runs in a single season. As of September 2011, he and Ryan Braun were the only two Brewers to have two 20-steals/20-homers seasons in their careers.

In 2008, Hart was selected as an outfielder to the National League team at the 2008 Major League Baseball All-Star Game, which took place on July 15 at Yankee Stadium. He was voted in by the fans as a final vote in which he beat out David Wright of the Mets as well as Pat Burrell of the Phillies, Aaron Rowand of the Giants, and Carlos Lee of the Astros (a former Brewer himself). On August 30, 2008, against the Pittsburgh Pirates, Hart became the first player in Brewers history to have back to back 20–20 seasons. Hart reached base on an error 14 times in 2008, more than any other batter in the NL.

In July 2010, Hart was voted by his peers to not only play in the All-Star Game in Anaheim, but also was selected by MLB officials to participate in the Home Run Derby. Hart had a breakout season in 2010 statistically. As the regular Brewers right fielder, he posted a career best 31 home runs, 102 RBIs, and a .283 batting average. Along with Ryan Braun, Prince Fielder, Rickie Weeks, and Casey McGehee, the Brewers had one of the best top five slots in the MLB.

On May 23, 2011, Hart tied the Brewers records for home runs in a game with three and RBIs with seven. Hart had another productive regular season with the Brewers in 2011, posting 26 home runs, and 63 RBIs with a .285 batting average, .386 OBP, and .866 OPS. Hart's drop in home runs and RBIs is a result of missing the first month of the season with an injury, and being moved to bat first in the order in July, limiting the number of RBI chances he had. Hart remained first in the batting order in the playoffs due to his success in the slot during the regular season.

Hart started the 2012 season as the Brewers regular right fielder, but injuries to Brewers first basemen Mat Gamel and Travis Ishikawa resulted in Hart becoming the Brewers regular first baseman, where he ended up having a successful season, recording a .995 fielding percentage playing in over 100 games at first base. He had a productive offensive season with the Brewers in 2012, batting .270 with 30 home runs and 83 RBIs.

Hart had surgery on his left knee in January 2013, and missed the entire 2013 season.

Seattle Mariners

On December 11, 2013, Hart agreed to a one-year, $6 million contract with the Seattle Mariners. The deal contained up to $7 million in incentives. He was designated for assignment on September 29, 2014.

Pittsburgh Pirates
The Pittsburgh Pirates signed Hart to a one-year, $2.5 million contract on December 19, 2014.

Hart finished his professional baseball career in 2015.

Retirement with the Milwaukee Brewers
On June 27, 2017, it was announced that Hart would officially retire from Major League Baseball as a Milwaukee Brewer after being honored at Miller Park on June 30 with a plaque on the park's Wall of Honor. A two-time All-Star, Hart spent nine of his 11 Major League seasons with the Brewers, batting .276 with 154 home runs, 508 RBI and 83 stolen bases in 945 games. He had five 20-home-run seasons in Milwaukee, tied with four others for third-most in franchise history. Among the 38 players who have collected at least 2,000 plate appearances in a Brewers uniform, his .491 slugging percentage ranks sixth all-time.

Career statistics
In 1048 games over 11 seasons, Hart compiled a .271 batting average (1009-for-3729) with 549 runs, 221 doubles, 33 triples, 162 home runs, 538 RBI, 85 stolen bases, 286 walks, .329 on-base percentage and .478 slugging percentage. Defensively, he recorded a .988 fielding percentage playing all three outfield positions and first base. In the postseason, in 14 playoff games, Hart batted .241 (13-for-54) with 6 runs, 2 home runs and 5 RBI.

Personal life 
Hart returns home to Bowling Green whenever possible and is active with local charities. Corey is the son of Johnnie and the late Donna Hart and has two sisters, Tabitha (older) and Ali (younger). He has said that he would be either a teacher or coach if he were not a baseball player.

Hart is a Christian.

References

External links 

1982 births
Living people
Milwaukee Brewers players
Seattle Mariners players
Pittsburgh Pirates players
Huntsville Stars players
Ogden Raptors players
High Desert Mavericks players
Indianapolis Indians players
Nashville Sounds players
Tacoma Rainiers players
Baseball players from Kentucky
Sportspeople from Bowling Green, Kentucky
Major League Baseball center fielders
Major League Baseball right fielders
National League All-Stars
Peoria Javelinas players